Nathan Cheever is an American video game designer and visual artist. The majority of his design experience has been level design and world design. He spoke at the 2002 Game Developer's Conference and was also a technology representative at both GDC and E3 that year for LithTech.

Two projects he contributed to were halted late in development due to Publisher issues.  During 2009 Konami suspended its role as a publisher for Six Days in Fallujah because of its controversial nature. In 2014 Prey 2 was officially cancelled after three years of inactivity.

In 2013 he joined 2K Games to be part of Hangar 13 on Mafia III.

Games
 Unreal: Return to Napli – (1999)
 Middle-Earth Online - (production halted in 1999)
 Wizards & Warriors – (2000)
 Aliens Versus Predator 2 – (2001)
 No One Lives Forever 2: A Spy in H.A.R.M.'s Way – (2002)
 The Suffering – (2004)
 The Suffering: Ties That Bind – (2005)
 Turok – (2008)
 Judgemental Shooting Simulator - (2009)
 Six Days in Fallujah – (production halted in 2009)
 Prey 2 – (production halted in 2011)
 Defiance – (2013)
 Mafia III – (2016)

Published Artwork
 Flash & Snowball - (2005)

References

External links
 
 
 

Living people
American video game designers
Year of birth missing (living people)
Place of birth missing (living people)